Center for Military History and Social Sciences of the Bundeswehr (Zentrum für Militärgeschichte und Sozialwissenschaften der Bundeswehr, abbreviated as ZMSBw) is a German research institution focused on military history and social sciences. Located in Potsdam, it is part of Germany's Federal Ministry of Defence. The organisation was formed in 2013 by merging the Military History Research Office (MGFA) and the 
.

Background and personnel
The organisation was formed from several research facilities of Germany. The Military History Research Office (MGFA) was formed in 1958 in West Germany and was based in Freiburg. The  was formed in Potsdam, East Germany in 1958. In 1994, the two institutions were combined. The new center is located at Villa Ingenheim in Potsdam, a historic building, which also houses military archives of East Germany's National People's Army.

The center employs 60 historians, political scientists, and sociologists, supported by 70 other employees. Some employees are in active military service and some are civilians. As of 2016, the commander of the center is Colonel  and its chief scientist is historian Michael Epkenhans who were appointed in 2009/2010. The Center's stated purpose is to "conduct fundamental research on military history as well as military-sociological and security-policy research for the Bundeswehr". The center publishers .

Select researchers 
The Center's researchers include the following historians:
 
 Peter Lieb
 
 Thomas Vogel

See also 
Bundeswehr Military History Museum

References

External links

Organizations established in 2013
Military research of Germany
Military historiography
Historiography of Germany
Military history of Germany
History organisations based in Germany
Naval history of Germany
Bundeswehr